The NFL Golf Classic was a golf tournament on the Champions Tour from 1993 to 2002. It was played in May or June at the Upper Montclair Country Club in Clifton, New Jersey. It was a joint production with the NFL and attracted top NFL talent to play in a tournament within a tournament (separate from the golf pros). NFL players Trent Dilfer and Al Del Greco frequently played to the top of the leaderboard. The 2000 edition was also the final competitive win for golfing great Lee Trevino. In its day it was amongst the more popular stops of the Champions Tour. 

The purse for the 2002 tournament was US$1,300,000, with $195,000 going to the winner. The tournament was founded in 1993 as the Cadillac NFL Golf Classic.

Winners

Source:

References

Former PGA Tour Champions events
Golf in New Jersey
Clifton, New Jersey
Recurring sporting events established in 1993
Recurring sporting events disestablished in 2002
1993 establishments in New Jersey
2002 disestablishments in New Jersey